Annina is a diminutive of the female given name Anna in the Italian language. Notable people with the name include:

 Annina Enckell
 Annina Ruest

See also
 Anniina Rajahuhta, Finnish hockey player
 Anna Girò, also known as Annina Girò, an Italian mezzo-soprano
 Annina, a role in the opera La traviata